Anita M. Cal (born October 14, 1966) is an American author, TV Writer, film producer, and international speaker best known for writing on the TBS family comedies, Tyler Perry's House of Payne and Tyler Perry's Meet the Browns.  Cal first made a name for herself as the Writer/Producer of the comedy feature Kinfolks, developed by Showtime, Inc., starring In The House TV daughter Maia Campbell.  Cal is also known as, A.M. Cal, the author of the December 2015 historical novel, Eighth Wonder: The Thomas Bethune Story, the true tale of a slave born blind, feeble, and left for dead who began playing Mozart at the age of three.  The debut novel was awarded a SELF-e Highlighted Book by Library Journal and made available in libraries throughout the 50 states.

Biography
Cal was born in Seattle, Washington, the daughter of Frances O. Cal, a manager for the State Department of Transportation and Relocation, and Clarence A. Cal, Sr., an electrical engineer for the Boeing Company. Her parents, both Southern University alumni, are of African American origin, having migrated from Baton Rouge, Louisiana to Tacoma, Washington, after her father, a former military officer was transferred to Fort Lewis.

Cal attended Rainier Beach High School and transferred to Chief Sealth High School. She was an off-guard for the city, district, and 5th in state championship basketball team graduating with honors in 1984 at the age of 17.  She attended the University of Washington, and was a member of the EIP Early Identification Program for minorities who maintained a 3.27 GPA or higher, graduating in 1988 with a degree in Communications, Broadcasting. She also studied screenwriting at Cal State University, Northridge, winning a Best Graduate Screenwriting Scholarship from Garry Marshall and graduating with honors in 1998. In 2015, Cal became a double doctoral student at Pepperdine University, studying Organizational Leadership and Global Leadership with expected graduation dates of May 2017 and May 2018. Cal became a published scholar during her first semester of doctoral studies when the International Journal of Arts and Sciences selected her research with Dr. Leo Mallette on Celebrities and the United Nations: Leadership and referent power of global film ambassadors.

Anita Cal began using her middle initial when she began writing as a reporter intern at the Seattle Times upon graduating college. She soon was selected as a general assignment and education reporter for the Los Angeles Times through the METPRO journalist training program.  Cal also covered education for the Times Mirror Greenwich Times.

References

1966 births
Living people
American television writers
American film directors
Writers from Seattle
University of Washington College of Arts and Sciences alumni
Screenwriters from Washington (state)
American women film producers
Film producers from Washington (state)
American women television writers
African-American women writers
African-American screenwriters
21st-century African-American people
21st-century African-American women
20th-century African-American people
20th-century African-American women